Events in the year 1929 in Norway.

Incumbents
 Monarch – Haakon VII

Events

 21 March – Crown Prince Olav (later King Olav) married his cousin, Princess Märtha of Sweden.
 8 May – Norway annexed the volcanic island Jan Mayen located in the Arctic Ocean.

Popular culture

Sports

Music

Film

Literature

Notable births
 
 

 1 January – Fredrik Olsen, shipping magnate
 3 January – Grethe Rytter Hasle, planktologist (died 2013)
 17 January – Jan Rasmus Skåre, judge
3 February – Arvid Johanson, politician and Minister
 10 February – Hallgeir Brenden, cross country skier and double Olympic gold medallist (died 2007)
 10 February – Einar W. Sissener, businessperson (died 2008)
 26 February – Bjørn Skau, politician and Minister
 4 March – Fredrik Hagemann, geologist and public servant (died 2019).
 5 April – Ivar Giaever, physicist, shared the Nobel Prize in Physics in 1973
 19 April – Guttorm Berge, alpine skier and Olympic bronze medallist (died 2004)
 20 April – Knut S. Heier, geochemist (died 2008)
 6 May – Jorun Askersrud, cross country skier and athlete
 7 May – Arnsten Samuelstuen, ski jumper
 10 May – Audun Boysen, middle-distance runner and Olympic bronze medallist (died 2000)
 10 May – John Gjerde, politician
 28 or 29 May – Dag Frogner, painter and scenographer (died 2015).
 31 May – Halvdan Ljøsne, painter (died 2006)
 11 June – Per Almar Aas, politician
 24 June – Oddvar Barlie, sports wrestler (died 2017).
 1 July – Sigurd Berge, composer (died 2002)
 8 July – Gunnar Block Watne, engineer and businessperson, introduced prefabricated houses in Norway (died 2016).
 13 July – Svein Ellingsen, visual artist and hymnist (died 2020])
 18 July – Kai Ekanger, politician
 26 August – Willy Arne Wold, politician (died 1996)
 24 September – Kåre Rønning, politician (died 1990)
 30 September – Kjell Askildsen, writer
 30 September – Helga Gitmark, politician (died 2008)
 18 October – Inger Sitter, painter and printmaker (died 2015).
 19 October – Thorbjørn Kultorp, politician (died 2004)
 22 October – Tore Sinding-Larsen, judge
 30 November – Leif Haraldseth, trade unionist, politician and Minister
 13 December – Lars Skytøen, politician and Minister
 14 December – Magne Lerheim, politician (died 1994)
 24 December – Sverre Wilberg, actor (died 1996)

Full date unknown
 Øystein Elgarøy, astronomer (died 1998)
 Nils Peder Langvand, judge (died 2002)
 Gunnar Solum, politician (died 2008)

Notable deaths

 6 January – August Herman Halvorsen, politician (born 1866)
 22 February – Gunnar Heiberg, playwright (born 1857).
 23 March – Rudolf Nilsen, poet and journalist (born 1901)
 2 May – Anders Svor, sculptor (born 1864)
 24 May – Just Bing Ebbesen, priest and politician (born 1847)
 8 June – Ole Larsen Skattebøl, judge and politician (born 1844)
 9 July – Hans Andersen Foss, author, newspaper editor and temperance leader in America (born 1851)
 1 August – Gregers Winther Wulfsberg Gram, jurist and politician (born 1846)
 12 September – Olaf Hovdenak, long-distance runner (born 1891)
 3 November – Olav Aukrust, poet and teacher (born 1883)
 19 November – Torleiv Hannaas, philologist (born 1874)
 14 December – Sigurd Jørgensen, gymnast and Olympic gold medallist (born 1887)

Full date unknown
 Mads Gram, physician (born 1875)
 Nils Otto Hesselberg, politician (born 1844)
 Christian Holtermann Knudsen, typographer, newspaper editor, publisher, trade unionist and politician (born 1845)
 Oscar Ludvig Stoud Platou, jurist and professor (born 1845)

See also

References

External links